The lingula is a small tongue-shaped process, consisting of four or five folia; it lies in front of the lobulus centralis, and is concealed by it.

Anteriorly, it rests on the dorsal surface of the anterior medullary velum, and its white substance is continuous with that of the velum.

Additional images

References

External links
 https://web.archive.org/web/20010514005529/http://www.ib.amwaw.edu.pl/anatomy/atlas/image_11e.htm

Cerebellum